Life Like is the fourteenth full-length studio album by Joan of Arc released in 2011 on Polyvinyl Records. It is also the first Joan of Arc album to feature former Cap'n Jazz guitarist, Victor Villarreal.

Track listing
 "I Saw the Messed Binds of My Generation" - 10:43
 "Love Life" - 3:03
 "Like Minded" - 5:07
 "Life Force" - 1:13
 "Night Life Style" - 3:55
 "Howdy Pardoner" - 4:10
 "Still Life" - 4:36
 "Deep State" - 5:18
 "After Life" - 2:47

References

Joan of Arc (band) albums
2011 albums